RAF Gaza was an Royal Air Force airfield on the southwest coast of Mandatory Palestine, in the present day Gaza Strip.

History
The airfield was one of the first to be built in Palestine. It was built in 1917 for military use by the Ottoman Empire, with German assistance.

RAF Gaza was used for passenger services by Imperial Airways (since 1927) and KLM (since 1933) as a stop en route to Baghdad and further to Karachi or Batavia, correspondingly. In the 1930s, an illustrated London magazine proclaimed that passengers overnighting at Gaza, hailed as "the gateway to the Holy Land", were staying where Samson had once removed the city gates.

During the Second World War RAF Gaza was used by a number of RAF squadrons, including 33, 45, 127, 208, 318 and 451 Squadrons. No. 2 Air Crew Officers School RAF was based on the airfield, and the Greek Training Flight RAF was also based there in 1941–1942. The airfield was used as the Middle East ammunition depot from July to September 1942. RAF Gaza was on the site of present-day Karni crossing between the Gaza Strip and Israel. Although no remains of the airfield itself are visible today, the British concrete road linking the airfield with the ammunition storage areas (located about 6 km south of the airfield, still visible today) is visible and in good shape.

See also
Gaza Strip
List of former Royal Air Force stations

References

Airports in the Gaza Strip
Buildings and structures in the Gaza Strip
Gaza
Gaza
World War II sites in Mandatory Palestine